The 1957 LPGA Championship was the third LPGA Championship, held June 6–10 at Churchill Valley Country Club in Blackridge, Pennsylvania, a suburb east of Pittsburgh.  It concluded on Monday, after rain washed out play on Saturday.

Louise Suggs, president of the LPGA, shot a final round 68 (−2) to win her only LPGA Championship, three strokes ahead of runner-up Wiffi Smith. Defending champion Marlene Hagge and 1955 winner Beverly Hanson finished two strokes behind Smith, in a tie for third. Smith, age 20, led after each of the first three rounds, but carded a 74 (+4) in the final round on Monday. She won eight events on the LPGA Tour in her career, but no majors. It was the tenth of eleven major titles for Suggs.

The field consisted of 26 professionals; a concurrent event for amateurs was also held. The championship returned to Churchill Valley the next year in 1958 and the course hosted its third major the following year, the U.S. Women's Open in 1959.
The club closed in 2013.

Past champions in the field

Source:

Final leaderboard
Monday, June 10, 1957

Source:

References

Women's PGA Championship
Golf in Pittsburgh
LPGA Championship
LPGA Championship
LPGA Championship
LPGA Championship
Women's sports in Pennsylvania